Baccharis eggersii is a species of flowering plant in the family Asteraceae that is endemic to Ecuador. Its natural habitat is subtropical or tropical dry forests. It is threatened by habitat loss. It may occur in Churute Mangroves Ecological Reserve and Machalilla National Park.

References

eggersii
Endemic flora of Ecuador
Flora of Esmeraldas Province
Data deficient plants
Taxonomy articles created by Polbot